Long Ago may refer to:

"Long Ago", song from the musical Half a Sixpence
"Long Ago", song by Mariah Carey from the album Daydream
"Long Ago", song by Hawk Nelson from the album Crazy Love
"Long Ago", song by Status Quo from the album Never Too Late
"Long Ago (and Far Away)", a song by Jerome Kern and Ira Gershwin from the 1944 film musical Cover Girl